(stylized as "OVERHEAT.NIGHT") is the second single by Japanese singer Chisato Moritaka. Written by Hiromasa Ijichi and Hideo Saitō, the single was released by Warner Pioneer on October 25, 1987. In contrast to the pop rock sound of Moritaka's debut single "New Season", the song uses a dance-pop arrangement.

"Overnight Heat" was also released as the B-side of the mini CD reissue of "New Season" on March 25, 1988.

The video album of "Overheat Night" was released in CDV format on November 28, 1988.

Warner Music Japan released the "Overheat Night (Extended Mix)" 12" vinyl on November 3, 2019.

Chart performance 
"Overheat Night" peaked at No. 24 on Oricon's singles chart and sold 22,000 copies. The 2019 Extended Mix LP reached No. 80.

Other versions 
"Overheat Night" was remixed for the 1989 greatest hits album Moritaka Land.

Moritaka re-recorded the song and uploaded the video on her YouTube channel on July 19, 2014. This version is also included in Moritaka's 2015 self-covers DVD album Love Vol. 7.

Track listing 
All lyrics are written by Hiromasa Ijichi, except where indicated; all music is composed and arranged by Hideo Saitō.

Personnel 
 Chisato Moritaka – vocals
 Hideo Saitō – guitar, backing vocals, drum and synthesizer programming
 Nobita Tsukada – keyboards, synthesizer programming
 Reuben Tsujino – percussion
 Shingo Kanno – congas
 Misa Nakayama – backing vocals

Chart positions

References

External links 
 
 
 

1987 singles
1987 songs
Japanese-language songs
Chisato Moritaka songs
Songs with lyrics by Hiromasa Ijichi
Songs with music by Hideo Saitō (musician, born 1958)
Warner Music Japan singles